Frank H. Bucher (December 19, 1900 – March 1970) was a football player from Fairport, New York. He played during the early years of the National Football League for the Pottsville Maroons from 1925-1926. In 1925 Bucher helped the Maroons win the NFL Championship, before it was stripped from the team due to a disputed rules violation.

Notes

1900 births
People from Fairport, New York
Players of American football from New York (state)
Detroit Titans football players
Pottsville Maroons players
1970 deaths